Catasetum macrocarpum, the large-fruited catasetum, is a species of orchid. It is also known as the monkey goblet and monk's head orchid. It is native to the Caribbean and South America, where its distribution extends from Trinidad and Tobago to Argentina.

References

External links

macrocarpum
Orchids of South America
Flora of the Caribbean
Orchids of Argentina
Flora of Trinidad and Tobago
Flora without expected TNC conservation status